The Garden Grove League is a high school athletic league that is part of the CIF Southern Section. Members are located in and around Garden Grove, Orange County.

Schools
 Bolsa Grande High School
 La Quinta High School
 Loara High School
 Los Amigos High School
 Rancho Alamitos High School
 Santiago High School

References

CIF Southern Section leagues
Sports in Orange County, California